The Colorado Kid is a 1937 American Western film directed by Sam Newfield and written by Charles F. Royal. The film stars Bob Steele, Marion Weldon, Karl Hackett, Ernie Adams, Ted Adams and Frank LaRue. The film was released on December 6, 1937, by Republic Pictures.

Plot
Bob, known as the Colorado Kid, is the foreman on the ranch of Colonel Gifford. A business transaction takes place in a saloon, where Gifford accepts $5000 from Wolf Hines for the sale of his livestock. Bob tries to get Gifford to leave the bar and go home, since he is very drunk and carrying so much money. Gifford refuses to leave, and during the disagreement, Bob is fired by Gifford. Gifford leaves the bar alone, and on his way home, Hines, who is the political boss of the town, murders Gifford in order to get the money back. Bob is then accused of the Gifford's murder.

Cast 
Bob Steele as Colorado Kid
Marion Weldon as Irma Toles
Karl Hackett as Wolf Hines
Ernie Adams as Bibben Tucker
Ted Adams as Sheriff Bill Hannon
Frank LaRue as Toles
Horace Murphy as Colonel Gifford
Kenne Duncan as Henchman Leathers 
Budd Buster as Henchman Hendry 
Frank Ball as Judge Smith
John Merton as Court Clerk

References

External links
 

1937 films
1930s English-language films
American Western (genre) films
1937 Western (genre) films
Republic Pictures films
Films directed by Sam Newfield
American black-and-white films
1930s American films